Scott Raecker (born August 30, 1961) has served in the Iowa House of Representatives from January 1999 to December 2012, representing the 63rd District. He received his BA in Political Science and Religious Studies from Grinnell College.

A Republican, Raecker served on several committees in the Iowa House - as chair of the Appropriations Committee, as vice chair of the Ethics Committee, and as a member of the State Government committee. He also served on the Governor's 2010 Strategic Planning Council in 2000 and the 21st Century Workforce Council in 1999.

He gained notoriety in 2011 for introducing legislation that would have required the University of Iowa to sell Jackson Pollock's Mural (1943), which the university owns and regularly displays at the University of Iowa Museum of Art. Raecker wanted the university to use proceeds from the sale to fund scholarships for University of Iowa students from Iowa. The painting's value was estimated at $140 million to $150 million. Raecker's bill did not become law.

In addition to his political career, Raecker has served as director of the Robert D. and Billie Ray Center (formerly known as Character Counts!) at Drake University.

Electoral history

*incumbent

References

External links

 Representative Scott Raecker official Iowa General Assembly site
 
Profile at Iowa House Republicans

Republican Party members of the Iowa House of Representatives
Living people
1961 births
Grinnell College alumni
Politicians from Waterloo, Iowa
People from Urbandale, Iowa